The list of ship launches in 1866 includes a chronological list of some ships launched in 1866.


References 

Sources

1866
1866 in transport